Rémi Gounelle (5 January 1967, Dreux) is a French protestant theologian, a professor of history of early Christianity at the  and dean of that same faculty since 2010.

Biography 
Rémi Gounelle holds a doctorate from the École pratique des hautes études, section of Religious Sciences, and a doctorate in theology from the Lausanne University. He was awarded the Prix Paul Chapuis-Secretan. He is also related to pastor  and Michel Hollard, a member of the French resistance .

Rémi Gounelle is holder of an habilitation. In 2003–2004, he was a lecturer in the Faculty of Theology of the University of Neuchâtel and scientific collaborator of the Romand Institute of Biblical Studies.

Research topics 
Rémi Gounelle's research interests include the Acts of Pilatius and the "cycle of Pilate", the Latin narratives of Christ's descent into hell, the formation of the canonical Scriptures and the statutes of the Biblical apocrypha, as well as the homilies by Eusebius of Alexandria and the Syrian-Palestinian literature of the fourth and fifth centuries, among others Cyril of Jerusalem and Eusebius of Emesa.

Publications

Books 
1997: L'Évangile de Nicodème ou les Actes faits sous Ponce Pilate (recension latine A), followed by La Lettre de Pilate à l'empereur Claude. Introduction and notes by Rémi Gounelle and Zbigniew Izydorczyk. Translation by R. Gounelle from a text developed by Z. Izydorczyk, Turnhout, Brepols (Apocryphes, 9)
2000: La Descente du Christ aux enfers. Institutionnalisation d'une croyance, Paris, Institut d'études augustiniennes (Collection des Études augustiniennes, Série Antiquité, 162)
2008: Les Recensions byzantines de l'Évangile de Nicodème, Turnhout - Prahins, Brepols - éditions du Zèbre (Corpus Christianorum, Series Apocryphorum, Instrumenta, 3 ; Instruments pour l'étude des langues de l'Orient ancien, 7)

Direction of books 
2004: La Descente du Christ aux enfers, Paris, Éditions du Cerf (Cahiers Évangile, Supplement 128)
2007: (with A. Frey) : Poussières de christianisme et de judaïsme antiques. Studies gathered in honour of Jean-Daniel Kaestli and Éric Junod, Prahins (CH), Éditions du Zèbre (Publications de l'Institut romand des sciences bibliques)
2008: (with A. Noblesse-Rocher) : Le Décalogue, Paris, Cerf (Cahiers Évangile, Supplement 144)
2008: (with J.-M. Prieur) : Le Décalogue au miroir des Pères, Strasbourg, Université Marc Bloch (Cahiers de Biblia Patristica, 9)
2009: Lire dans le texte les apocryphes chrétiens, Paris, Cerf (Cahiers Évangile, Supplement 148)
2014: (with J. Joosten) : La Bible juive dans l’Antiquité, Prahins (CH), éditions du Zèbre (Histoire du texte biblique, 9)
2015: (with B. Mounier) : La Littérature apocryphe chrétienne et les Écritures juives, Prahins (CH), éditions du Zèbre

Collective works 
 Christologie entre dogmes, doutes et remises en question, ed. Van Dieren
Van Dieren, 2003

References

See also 
 Christology

External links 
 Rémi Gounelle, site de l'université de Strasbourg
 Rémi Gounelle, site du CNRS
 Le Christianisme antique (Ier-Ve siècles) de Paul Mattei par Rémi Gounelle, cairn.info
 Réponse de Paul Mattei à Rémi Gounelle, site ASSR (Archives de sciences sociales des religions)

French Protestant theologians
Historians of Christianity
École pratique des hautes études alumni
University of Lausanne alumni
Writers from Dreux
1967 births
Living people
French historians of religion